Bobs Lake is a lake in the Saint Lawrence River drainage basin in the township of North Frontenac, Frontenac County in eastern Ontario, Canada.

The primary inflow is Peterson Creek at the southwest, and the primary outflow is also Peterson Creek at the northwest, which flows to the South Branch Clyde River and via the Mississippi River and Ottawa River to the Saint Lawrence River.

See also
List of lakes in Ontario

References

Lakes of Frontenac County